The National Academy of Music "Prof. Pancho Vladigerov" (Natsionalna muzikalna akademia „Pancho Vladigerov“), also known under its former name, the Bulgarian State Conservatoire (Българска държавна консерватория, Balgarska darzhavna konservatoria), is a university of music in Sofia, the capital of Bulgaria.

Founded in 1921 through a royal decree of Tsar Boris III, it is named after influential Bulgarian composer Pancho Vladigerov (1899–1978).

Two buildings house the academy. It offers 30 programmes divided into three faculties: the Faculty of Theory, Composition and Conducting; the Instrumental Faculty; and the Vocal Faculty.

Notable graduates
Albert Cohen
Ghena Dimitrova
Milen E. Ivanov
Raina Kabaivanska
Ramiz Kovaçi
Kiril Manolov
Alexander Raichev
Stefan Remenkov
Alexander Yossifov
Anna-Maria Ravnopolska-Dean
Victor Chuchkov
Grigor Palikarov
Slavi Trifonov

External links
 Official website 

Universities and colleges in Sofia
Educational institutions established in 1921
Music schools in Bulgaria
1921 establishments in Bulgaria
Arts organizations established in 1921